The written history of New York City began with the first European explorer, the Italian Giovanni da Verrazzano in 1524. European settlement began with the Dutch in 1608.

The "Sons of Liberty" campaigned against British authority in New York City, and the Stamp Act Congress of representatives from throughout the Thirteen Colonies met in the city in 1765 to organize resistance to Crown policies. The city's strategic location and status as a major seaport made it the prime target for British seizure in 1776. General George Washington lost a series of battles from which he narrowly escaped (with the notable exception of the Battle of Harlem Heights, his first victory of the war), and the British Army occupied New York and made it their base on the continent until late 1783, attracting Loyalist refugees.

The city served as the national capital under the Articles of Confederation from 1785 to 1789, and briefly served as the new nation's capital in 1789–90 under the United States Constitution. Under the new government the city hosted the inauguration of George Washington as the first President of the United States, the drafting of the United States Bill of Rights, and the first Supreme Court of the United States. The opening of the Erie Canal gave excellent steamboat connections with upstate New York and the Great Lakes, along with coastal traffic to lower New England, making the city the preeminent port on the Atlantic Ocean. The arrival of rail connections to the north and west in the 1840s and 1850s strengthened its central role.

Beginning in the mid-19th century, waves of new immigrants arrived from Europe dramatically changing the composition of the city and serving as workers in the expanding industries. Modern New York traces its development to the consolidation of the five boroughs in 1898 and an economic and building boom following the Great Depression and World War II. Throughout its history, New York has served as a main port of entry for many immigrants, and its cultural and economic influence has made it one of the most important urban areas in the United States and the world. The economy in the 1700s was based on farming, local production, fur trading, and Atlantic jobs like ship building. In the 1700s New York was sometimes referred to as a breadbasket colony, because one of its major crops was wheat. New York Colony also exported other goods included iron ore as a raw material and as manufactured goods such as tools, plows, nails and kitchen items such as kettles, pans and pots.

Native American settlement
The area that eventually encompassed modern day New York was inhabited by the Lenape people. These groups of culturally and linguistically related Native Americans traditionally spoke an Algonquian language now referred to as Unami. Early European settlers called bands of Lenape by the Unami place name for where they lived, such as "Raritan" in Staten Island and New Jersey, "Canarsee" in Brooklyn, and "Hackensack" in New Jersey across the Hudson River from Lower Manhattan. Some modern place names such as Raritan Bay and Canarsie are derived from Lenape names. Eastern Long Island neighbors were culturally and linguistically more closely related to the Mohegan-Pequot peoples of New England who spoke the Mohegan-Montauk-Narragansett language.

These peoples made use of the abundant waterways in the New York region for fishing, hunting trips, trade, and occasionally war. Many paths created by the indigenous peoples are now main thoroughfares, such as Broadway in Manhattan, the Bronx, and Westchester. The Lenape developed sophisticated techniques of hunting and managing their resources. By the time of the arrival of Europeans, they were cultivating fields of vegetation through the slash and burn technique, which extended the productive life of planted fields. They also harvested vast quantities of fish and shellfish from the bay. Historians estimate that at the time of European settlement, approximately 5,000 Lenape lived in 80 settlements around the region.

European exploration and settlement

New Angoulême
The first European visitor to the area was Giovanni da Verrazzano, an Italian in command of the French ship La Dauphine in 1524. It is believed he sailed into Upper New York Bay, where he encountered native Lenape, returned through the Narrows, where he anchored the night of April 17, and left to continue his voyage. He named the area New Angoulême in honor of Francis I, King of France of the royal house of Valois-Angoulême and who had been Count of Angoulême from 1496 until his coronation in 1515. The name refers to the town of Angoulême, in the Charente département of France. For the next century, the area was occasionally visited by fur traders or explorers, such as by Esteban Gomez in 1525.

European exploration continued on September 2, 1609, when the Englishman Henry Hudson, in the employ of the Dutch East India Company, sailed the Half Moon through the Narrows into Upper New York Bay. Like Christopher Columbus, Hudson was looking for a westerly passage to Asia. He never found one, but he did take note of the abundant beaver population. Beaver pelts were in fashion in Europe, fueling a lucrative business. Hudson's report on the regional beaver population served as the impetus for the founding of Dutch trading colonies in the New World. The beaver's importance in New York's history is reflected by its use on the city's official seal.

Dutch settlement

The first Dutch fur trading posts and settlements were in 1614 near present-day Albany, New York, the same year that New Netherland first appeared on maps. Only in May 1624, the Dutch West India Company landed a number of families at Noten Eylant (today's Governors Island) off the southern tip of Manhattan at the mouth of the North River (today's Hudson River). Soon thereafter, most likely in 1626, construction of Fort Amsterdam began. Later, the Dutch West Indies Company imported African slaves to serve as laborers; they helped to build the wall that defended the town against English and Indian attacks. Early directors included Willem Verhulst and Peter Minuit. Willem Kieft became director in 1638 but five years later was embroiled in Kieft's War against the Native Americans. The Pavonia Massacre, across the Hudson River in present-day Jersey City, resulted in the death of 80 natives in February 1643. Following the massacre, Algonquian tribes joined forces and nearly defeated the Dutch. Holland sent additional forces to the aid of Kieft, leading to the overwhelming defeat of the Native Americans and a peace treaty on August 29, 1645.

On May 27, 1647, Peter Stuyvesant was inaugurated as director general upon his arrival and ruled as a member of the Dutch Reformed Church. The colony was granted self-government in 1652, and New Amsterdam was incorporated as a city on February 2, 1653. The first mayors (burgemeesters) of New Amsterdam, Arent van Hattem and Martin Cregier, were appointed in that year. By the early 1660s, the population consisted of approximately 1500 Europeans, only about half of whom were Dutch, and 375 Africans, 300 of whom were slaves.

A few of the original Dutch place names have been retained, most notably Flushing (after the Dutch town of Vlissingen), Harlem (after Haarlem), and Brooklyn (after Breukelen). Few buildings, however, remain from the 17th century. The oldest recorded house still in existence in New York, the Pieter Claesen Wyckoff House in Brooklyn, dates from 1652.

English rule: 1664–1783

On August 27, 1664, four English frigates under the command of Col. Richard Nicolls sailed into New Amsterdam's harbor and demanded New Netherland's surrender, as part of an effort by king Charles' brother James, Duke of York, the Lord High Admiral to provoke the Second Anglo-Dutch War. Two weeks later, Stuyvesant officially capitulated by signing Articles of Surrender and in June 1665, the town was reincorporated under English law and renamed "New York" after the Duke, and Fort Orange was renamed "Fort Albany". The war ended in a Dutch victory in 1667, but the colony remained under English rule as stipulated in the Treaty of Breda. During the Third Anglo-Dutch War, the Dutch briefly recaptured the city in 1673, renaming the city "New Orange", before permanently ceding the colony of New Netherland to the English for what is now Suriname in November 1674 at the Treaty of Westminster.

The colony benefited from increased immigration from Europe and its population grew faster. The Bolting Act of 1678, whereby no mill outside the city was permitted to grind wheat or corn, boosted growth until its repeal in 1694, increasing the number of houses over the period from 384 to 983.

In the context of the Glorious Revolution in England, Jacob Leisler led Leisler's Rebellion and effectively controlled the city and surrounding areas from 1689 to 1691, before being arrested and executed.

Lawyers
In New York at first, legal practitioners were full-time businessmen and merchants, with no legal training, who had watched a few court proceedings, and mostly used their own common sense together with snippets they had picked up about English law. Court proceedings were quite informal, for the judges had no more training than the attorneys.

By the 1760s, the situation had dramatically changed. Lawyers were essential to the rapidly growing international trade, dealing with questions of partnerships, contracts, and insurance. The sums of money involved were large, and hiring an incompetent lawyer was a very expensive proposition. Lawyers were now professionally trained, and conversant in an extremely complex language that combined highly specific legal terms and motions with a dose of Latin. Court proceedings became a baffling mystery to the ordinary layman. Lawyers became more specialized and built their reputation, and their fee schedule, on the basis of their reputation for success. But as their status, wealth and power rose, animosity grew even faster. By the 1750s and 1760s, there was a widespread attack ridiculing and demeaning the lawyers as pettifoggers (lawyers lacking sound legal skills). Their image and influence declined. The lawyers organized a bar association, but it fell apart in 1768 during the bitter political dispute between the factions based in the Delancey and Livingston families.  A large fraction of the prominent lawyers were Loyalists; their clientele was often to royal authority or British merchants and financiers. They were not allowed to practice law unless they took a loyalty oath to the new United States of America. Many went to Britain or Canada (primarily to New Brunswick and Nova Scotia) after losing the war.

For the next century, various attempts were made, and failed, to build an effective organization of lawyers. Finally a Bar Association emerged in 1869 that proved successful and continues to operate.

Native Americans and slaves

By 1700, the Lenape population of New York had diminished to 200. The Dutch West Indies Company transported African slaves to the post as trading laborers used to build the fort and stockade, and some gained freedom under the Dutch. After the seizure of the colony in 1664, the slave trade continued to be legal. In 1703, 42% of the New York households had slaves; they served as domestic servants and laborers but also became involved in skilled trades, shipping and other fields. Yet following reform in ethics according to American Enlightenment thought, by the 1770s slaves made up less than 25% of the population.

By the 1740s, 20% of the residents of New York were slaves, totaling about 2,500 people.

After a series of fires in 1741, the city became panicked that blacks planned to burn the city in conspiracy with some poor whites. Historians believe their alarm was mostly fabrication and fear, but officials rounded up 31 blacks and 4 whites, who over a period of months were convicted of arson. Of these, the city executed 13 blacks by burning them alive and hanged 4 whites and 18 blacks.

In 1754, Columbia University was founded under charter by King George II as King's College in Lower Manhattan.

American Revolution

The Stamp Act and other British measures fomented dissent, particularly among Sons of Liberty who maintained a long-running skirmish with locally stationed British troops over Liberty Poles from 1766 to 1776. The Stamp Act Congress met in New York City in 1765 in the first organized resistance to British authority across the colonies. After the major defeat of the Continental Army in the Battle of Long Island in late 1776, General George Washington withdrew to Manhattan Island, but with the subsequent defeat at the Battle of Fort Washington the island was effectively left to the British. The city became a haven for loyalist refugees, becoming a British stronghold for the entire war. Consequently, the area also became the focal point for Washington's espionage and intelligence-gathering throughout the war.

New York was greatly damaged twice by fires of suspicious origin, with the Loyalists and Patriots accusing each other of starting the conflagration. The city became the political and military center of operations for the British in North America for the remainder of the war. Continental Army officer Nathan Hale was hanged in Manhattan for espionage. In addition, the British began to hold the majority of captured American prisoners of war aboard prison ships in Wallabout Bay, across the East River in Brooklyn. More Americans lost their lives aboard these ships than died in all the battles of the war. The British occupation lasted until November 25, 1783. George Washington triumphantly returned to the city that day, as the last British forces left the city.

Federal and early America: 1784–1854

Starting in 1785 the Congress met in the city of New York under the Articles of Confederation. In 1789, New York became the first national capital under the new Constitution. The Constitution also created the current Congress of the United States, and its first sitting was at Federal Hall on Wall Street. The first Supreme Court sat there. The United States Bill of Rights was drafted and ratified there. George Washington was inaugurated at Federal Hall. New York remained the national capital until 1790, when the role was transferred to Philadelphia.

During the 19th century, the city was transformed by immigration, a visionary development proposal called the Commissioners' Plan of 1811 which expanded the city street grid to encompass all of Manhattan, and the opening of the Erie Canal in 1825, which connected the Atlantic port to the vast agricultural markets of the Midwestern United States and Canada. By 1835, New York had surpassed Philadelphia as the largest city in the United States. New York grew as an economic center, first as a result of Alexander Hamilton's policies and practices as the first Secretary of the Treasury.

In 1842, water was piped from a reservoir to supply the city for the first time.

The Great Irish Famine (1845–1850) brought a large influx of Irish immigrants, and by 1850 the Irish comprised one quarter of the city's population. Government institutions, including the New York City Police Department and the public schools, were established in the 1840s and 1850s to respond to growing demands of residents.

Modern history

Tammany and consolidation: 1855–1897

This period started with the 1855 inauguration of Fernando Wood as the first mayor from Tammany Hall. It was the political machine based among Irish Americans that controlled the local Democratic Party.  It usually dominated local politics throughout this period and into the 1930s.  Public-minded members of the merchant community pressed for a Central Park, which was opened to a design competition in 1857; it became the first landscape park in an American city.

During the American Civil War (1861–1865), the city was affected by its history of strong commercial ties to the South; before the war, half of its exports were related to cotton, including textiles from upstate mills. Together with its growing immigrant population, which was angry about conscription, sympathies among residents were divided for both the Union and Confederacy at the outbreak of war. Tensions related to the war culminated in the Draft Riots of 1863 led by Irish Catholics, who attacked black neighborhood and abolitionist homes. Many blacks left the city and moved to Brooklyn. After the Civil War, the rate of immigration from Europe grew steeply, and New York became the first stop for millions seeking a new and better life in the United States, a role acknowledged by the dedication of the Statue of Liberty in 1886.

Early 20th century: 1898–1945

From 1890 to 1930, the largest cities, led by New York, were the focus of international attention. The skyscrapers and tourist attractions were widely publicized. Suburbs were emerging as bedroom communities for commuters to the central city. San Francisco dominated the West, Atlanta dominated the South, Boston dominated New England; Chicago dominated the Midwest United States. New York City dominated the entire nation in terms of communications, trade, finance, popular culture, and high culture. More than a fourth of the 300 largest corporations in 1920 were headquartered here.

In 1898, the modern City of New York was formed with the consolidation of Brooklyn (until then an independent city), Manhattan, and outlying areas. Manhattan and the Bronx were established as two separate boroughs and joined with three other boroughs created from parts of adjacent counties to form the new municipal government originally called "Greater New York". The Borough of Brooklyn incorporated the independent City of Brooklyn, recently joined to Manhattan by the Brooklyn Bridge; the Borough of Queens was created from western Queens County (with the remnant established as Nassau County in 1899); and the Borough of Richmond contained all of Richmond County. Municipal governments contained within the boroughs were abolished, and the county governmental functions were absorbed by the city or each borough. In 1914, the New York State Legislature created Bronx County, making five counties coterminous with the five boroughs.

The Bronx had a steady boom period during 1898–1929, with a population growth by a factor of six from 200,000 in 1900 to 1.3 million in 1930. The Great Depression created a surge of unemployment, especially among the working class, and a slow-down of growth.

On June 15, 1904, over 1,000 people, mostly German immigrant women and children, were killed when the excursion steamship General Slocum caught fire and sank. It is the city's worst maritime disaster. On March 25, 1911, the Triangle Shirtwaist Factory fire in Greenwich Village took the lives of 146 garment workers. In response, the city made great advancements in the fire department, building codes, and workplace regulations.

Throughout the first half of the 20th century, the city became a world center for industry, commerce, and communication, marking its rising influence with such events as the Hudson-Fulton Celebration of 1909. Interborough Rapid Transit (the first New York City Subway company) began operating in 1904, and the railroads operating out of Grand Central Terminal and Pennsylvania Station thrived.

The city was a destination for internal migrants as well as immigrants. Through 1940, New York was a major destination for African Americans during the Great Migration from the rural American South.  The Harlem Renaissance flourished during the 1920s and the era of Prohibition. New York's ever accelerating changes and rising crime and poverty rates were reduced after World War I disrupted trade routes, the Immigration Restriction Acts limited additional immigration after the war, and the Great Depression reduced the need for new labor. The combination ended the rule of the Gilded Age barons. As the city's demographics temporarily stabilized, labor unionization helped the working class gain new protections and middle-class affluence, the city's government and infrastructure underwent a dramatic overhaul under Fiorello La Guardia, and his controversial parks commissioner, Robert Moses, ended the blight of many tenement areas, expanded new parks, remade streets, and restricted and reorganized zoning controls.

For a while, New York ranked as the most populous city in the world, overtaking London in 1925, which had reigned for a century. During the difficult years of the Great Depression, the reformer Fiorello La Guardia was elected as mayor, and Tammany Hall fell after eighty years of political dominance.

Despite the effects of the Great Depression, some of the world's tallest skyscrapers were built during the 1930s. Art Deco architecture—such as the iconic Chrysler Building, Empire State Building, and 30 Rockefeller Plaza— came to define the city's skyline. The construction of the Rockefeller Center occurred in the 1930s and was the largest-ever private development project at the time. Both before and especially after World War II, vast areas of the city were also reshaped by the construction of bridges, parks and parkways coordinated by Robert Moses, the greatest proponent of automobile-centered modernist urbanism in America.

Post–World War II: 1946–1977

Returning World War II veterans and immigrants from Europe created a postwar economic boom. Demands for new housing were aided by the G.I. Bill for veterans, stimulating the development of huge suburban tracts in eastern Queens and Nassau County. The city was extensively photographed during the post–war years by photographer Todd Webb.

New York emerged from the war as the leading city of the world, with Wall Street leading the United States ascendancy. In 1951, the United Nations relocated from its first headquarters in Flushing Meadows Park, Queens, to the East Side of Manhattan. During the late 1960s, the views of real estate developer and city leader Robert Moses began to fall out of favor as the anti-urban renewal views of Jane Jacobs gained popularity. Citizen rebellion stopped a plan to construct an expressway through Lower Manhattan.

After a short war boom, the Bronx declined from 1950 to 1985, going from predominantly moderate-income to mostly lower-income, with high rates of violent crime and poverty. The Bronx has experienced an economic and developmental resurgence starting in the late 1980s that continues into today.

The transition away from the industrial base toward a service economy picked up speed, while the jobs in the large shipbuilding and garment industries declined sharply. The ports converted to container ships, costing many traditional jobs among longshoremen. Many large corporations moved their headquarters to the suburbs or to distant cities. At the same time, there was enormous growth in services, especially finance, education, medicine, tourism, communications and law. New York remained the largest city and largest metropolitan area in the United States, and continued as its largest financial, commercial, information, and cultural center.

Like many major U.S. cities, New York suffered race riots, gang wars and some population decline in the late 1960s.  Street activists and minority groups such as the Black Panthers and Young Lords organized rent strikes and garbage offensives, demanding improved city services for poor areas.  They also set up free health clinics and other programs, as a guide for organizing and gaining "Power to the People." By the 1970s the city had gained a reputation as a crime-ridden relic of history. In 1975, the city government avoided bankruptcy only through a federal loan and debt restructuring by the Municipal Assistance Corporation, headed by Felix Rohatyn. The city was also forced to accept increased financial scrutiny by an agency of New York State. In 1977, the city was struck by the New York City blackout of 1977 and serial slayings by the Son of Sam.

1978–present

The 1980s began a rebirth of Wall Street, and the city reclaimed its role at the center of the worldwide financial industry.  Unemployment and crime remained high, the latter reaching peak levels in some categories around the close of the decade and the beginning of the 1990s. Neighborhood restoration projects funded by the city and state had very good effects for New York, especially Bedford-Stuyvesant, Harlem, and The Bronx. The city later resumed its social and economic recovery, bolstered by the influx of Asians, Latin Americans, and U.S. citizens, and by new crime-fighting techniques on the part of the New York Police Department. In 1989, New York City elected its first African American Mayor, David Dinkins. He came out of the Harlem Clubhouse.

In the late 1990s, the city benefited from the nationwide fall of violent crime rates, the resurgence of the finance industry, and the growth of the "Silicon Alley", during the dot com boom, one of the factors in a decade of booming real estate values. New York was also able to attract more business and convert abandoned industrialized neighborhoods into arts or attractive residential neighborhoods; examples include the Meatpacking District and Chelsea (in Manhattan)  and Williamsburg (in Brooklyn).

New York's population reached an all-time high in the 2000 census; according to census estimates since 2000, the city has continued to grow, including rapid growth in the most urbanized borough, Manhattan. During this period, New York City was a site of the September 11 attacks of 2001; 2,606 people who were in the towers and in the surrounding area were killed by a terrorist attack on the World Trade Center, an event considered highly traumatic for the city but which did not stop the city's rapid regrowth. On November 3, 2014, One World Trade Center opened on the site of the attack. Hurricane Sandy brought a destructive storm surge to New York in the evening of October 29, 2012, flooding numerous streets, tunnels, and subway lines in Lower Manhattan. It flooded low-lying areas of Brooklyn, Queens, and Staten Island. Electrical power was lost in many parts of the city and its suburbs.

The city went into lockdown in March 2020 amidst the first wave of the COVID-19 pandemic. , New York City has experienced the most deaths of any locality in the coronavirus pandemic in New York state, which itself has the highest number of confirmed coronavirus cases of any state in the United States. During the first wave, one-third of total known U.S. cases were in New York City.

See also
 American urban history
 Timeline of New York City
 Here Grows New York - film history of city from 1609 to present

Boroughs
History of the Bronx
History of Brooklyn
History of Queens
History of Staten Island
History of Manhattan

Streets and thoroughfares
History of Fifth Avenue
History of Broadway
History of Wall Street

Small islands
Hart Island
Rikers Island
Randall's Island
Liberty Island
Governors Island
City Island
Roosevelt Island
Ellis Island – New Jersey/NYC

Miscellany
New-York Historical Society
Museum of the City of New York
New York: A Documentary Film
New York City water supply system
Timeline of New York City crimes and disasters
Kenneth T. Jackson — historian
List of newspapers in New York in the 18th century

Notes

References

Further reading

 Abu-Lughod, Janet L. New York, Chicago, Los Angeles: America's Global Cities (U of Minnesota Press, 1999), Compares the three cities in terms of geography, economics and race from 1800 to 1990
 Anbinder, Tyler. City of Dreams: The 400-Year Epic History of Immigrant New York (Houghton Mifflin Harcourt, 2016). 766 pp. 
 Archdeacon, Thomas J. New York City, 1664–1710: Conquest and Change (1976)
 , The standard scholarly history, 1390pp  onlibe review; Pulitzer Prize; excerpt
 Wallace, Mike. Greater Gotham: A History of New York City from 1898 to 1919 (2017) excerpt
 Burns, Ric, and James Sanders. New York: An Illustrated History (2003), book version of 17-hour Burns PBS documentary, "NEW YORK: A Documentary Film"
 Ellis, Edward Robb. The Epic of New York City: A Narrative History (2004) 640pp; Excerpt and text search; Popular history concentrating on violent events & scandals 
 
 Hershkowitz, Leo. Tweed's New York: Another Look. (New York: Anchor Press, 1977); scholarly study that argues Tweed was mostly innocent. online review
 Homberger, Eric. The Historical Atlas of New York City: A Visual Celebration of 400 Years of New York City's History (2005) online
 Hood. Clifton. In Pursuit of Privilege: A History of New York City's Upper Class and the Making of a Metropolis (2016). Cover 1760–1970.
 ; second edition 2010
 Jackson, Kenneth T. and Roberts, Sam (eds.) The Almanac of New York City (2008)
 Jaffe, Steven H. New York at War: Four Centuries of Combat, Fear, and Intrigue in Gotham  (2012)  Excerpt and text search
 Kessner, Thomas. Fiorello H. LaGuardia and the Making of Modern New York (1989) the most detailed standard scholarly biography online
 Lankevich, George J. New York City: A Short History (2002)
 McCully, Betsy. City At The Water's Edge: A Natural History of New York (2005), environmental history excerpt and text search
 Quigley, David.  Second Founding: New York City, Reconstruction, and the Making of American Democracy (Hill and Wang, 2004) excerpt
 Reitano, Joanne. The Restless City: A Short History of New York from Colonial Times to the Present (2010), Popular history with focus on politics and riots  excerpt and text search
 Rosenwaike, Ira. Population history of New York City (1972) online
 Syrett, Harold Coffin. The city of Brooklyn, 1865-1898: a political history (Columbia University press, 1944) online

Primary sources
 Burke, Katie. ed. Manhattan Memories: A Book of Postcards of Old New York (2000); Postcards lacking the (c) symbol are not copyright and are in the public domain.
  Dinkins, David N. A Mayor's Life: Governing New York's Gorgeous Mosaic (PublicAffairs Books, 2013)
 Gellman, David N.  and David Quigley, eds. Jim Crow New York: A Documentary History of Race and Citizenship, 1777-1877 (2003)
 Jackson, Kenneth T. and David S. Dunbar, eds. Empire City: New York Through the Centuries 1015 pages of excerpts online
 Kouwenhoven, John Atlee. The Columbia Historical Portrait of New York: An Essay In Graphic History. (1953)
 Paterson, David. Black, Blind, & In Charge: A Story of Visionary Leadership and Overcoming Adversity.  New York, 2020)

 Still, Bayrd, ed. Mirror for Gotham: New York as Seen by Contemporaries from Dutch Days to the Present (New York University Press, 1956) 
 Stokes, I.N. Phelps. The Iconography of Manhattan Island, 1498-1909 compiled from original sources and illustrated by photo-intaglio reproductions of important maps plans views and documents in public and private collections  (6 vols., 1915–28). A highly detailed, heavily illustrated chronology of Manhattan and New York City. see The Iconography of Manhattan Island All volumes are on line free at:
 I.N. Phelps Stokes; The Iconography of Manhattan Island Vol 1. 1915 v. 1. The period of discovery (1524-1609); the Dutch period (1609-1664). The English period (1664-1763). The Revolutionary period (1763-1783). Period of adjustment and reconstruction; New York as the state and federal capital (1783-1811)	
 I.N. Phelps Stokes; The Iconography of Manhattan Island Vol 2. 1916 v. 2. Cartography: an essay on the development of knowledge regarding the geography of the east coast of North America; Manhattan Island and its environs on early maps and charts / by F.C. Wieder and I.N. Phelps Stokes. The Manatus maps. The Castello plan. The Dutch grants. Early New York newspapers (1725-1811). Plan of Manhattan Island in 1908
 I.N. Phelps Stokes; The Iconography of Manhattan Island Vol 3. 1918 v. 3. The War of 1812 (1812-1815). Period of invention, prosperity, and progress (1815-1841). Period of industrial and educational development (1842-1860). The Civil War (1861-1865); period of political and social development (1865-1876). The modern city and island (1876-1909)
 I.N. Phelps Stokes; The Iconography of Manhattan Island Vol 4. 1922; v. 4. The period of discovery (565-1626); the Dutch period (1626-1664). The English period (1664-1763). The Revolutionary period, part I (1763-1776)
 I.N. Phelps Stokes; The Iconography of Manhattan Island Vol 5. 1926; v. 5. The Revolutionary period, part II (1776-1783). Period of adjustment and reconstruction New York as the state and federal capital (1783-1811). The War of 1812 (1812-1815) ; period of invention, prosperity, and progress (1815-1841). Period of industrial and educational development (1842-1860). The Civil War (1861-1865) ; Period of political and social development (1865-1876). The modern city and island (1876-1909)
 I.N. Phelps Stokes; The Iconography of Manhattan Island Vol 6. 1928; v. 6. Chronology: addenda. Original grants and farms. Bibliography. Index.
 Virga, Vincent, ed. Historic Maps and Views of New York (2008)

Further viewing
 New York: A Documentary Film: an eight part, 17 hour documentary film directed by Ric Burns for PBS. It originally aired in 1999 with additional episodes airing in 2001 and 2003.

External links

 
 
Gotham Center for New York City History
Museum of the City of New York
New-York Historical Society
 Boston Public Library, Map Center. Maps of NYC , various dates
 

Select "New York City" value to browse NYC Maps (satyrical, political, pictorial)  from 1883 to 1984 at the Persuasive Cartography, The PJ Mode Collection, Cornell University Library. 

 
Articles which contain graphical timelines
Air pollution in New York City